Bissy (de) a French noble family. Members of the family have been poets, generals, bishops, explorers and resistance fighters.

History of the family

Coat of arms

The coat of arms of the family is three red crayfish on a gold surface.

Notable members

 Pontus de Tyard de Bissy (1521–1605), French poet.
 Héliodore de Thiard de Bissy (1557–1594), Governor of Verdun-sur-le-Doubs.
 Henri-Pons de Thiard de Bissy (1657–1737), Bishop of Toul (1687–1704) and Maux (1704–1737), Cardinal (1715), confident of King Louis XIV of France: he wrote his will and gave him the anointing of the sick before his death.
 Claude de Thiard de Bissy (1721–1810), Head of the French Royal Army during the  conquest of Franche-Comté, Governor of Languedoc, member of the Académie française.
 Henri de Thiard de Bissy (1723–1794), Brother of Claude, French general.
  (1768–1803), French explorer who participated scientific expedition in Southern oceans.
 Monique de Bissy (1923–2009), French resistant during World War II.

References 

Italian noble families
French noble families
Military history of France